The Battle of St. Lucia or the Battle of the Cul de Sac was a naval battle fought off the island of St. Lucia in the West Indies during the American Revolutionary War on 15 December 1778, between the British Royal Navy and the French Navy.

Background

The French had entered the American Revolutionary War on behalf of the rebels and were conducting actions in the Caribbean to try to take over British colonies there. On 7 September 1778, the French governor of Martinique, the marquis de Bouillé, surprised and captured the British island of Dominica. On 4 November, French Admiral Jean Baptiste Charles Henri Hector, Comte d'Estaing sailed for the West Indies from the port of Boston, Massachusetts.  On that same day, Commodore William Hotham was dispatched from Sandy Hook, New Jersey, to reinforce the British fleet in the West Indies. Hotham sailed with "five men of war, a bomb vessel, some frigates, and a large convoy."  The convoy Hotham was escorting consisted of 59 transports carrying 5,000 British soldiers under Major General Grant. The French fleet was blown off course by a violent storm, preventing it from arriving in the Caribbean ahead of the British. Admiral Samuel Barrington, the British naval commander stationed on the Leeward Islands, joined the newly arrived Commodore Hotham on 10 December at the island of Barbados.  Grant's men were not permitted to disembark and spent the next several days aboard their transports.  Barrington and Hotham sailed for the island of St. Lucia on the morning of 12 December.

On the evening of 13 December and morning of 14 December, Major General James Grant, supported by additional troops under Brigadier General William Medows and Brigadier General Robert Prescott, landed at Grand Cul de Sac, St. Lucia.  Grant and Prescott took control of the high ground around the bay, while Medows continued on and took Vigie the following morning (14 December).  On 14 December the French fleet under d’Estaing arrived, forcing Admiral Barrington to move his ships into line of battle and forgo his plan of moving the transports into Carénage Bay.

Battle 

Admiral Barrington was alerted to the presence of the French fleet by the frigate Ariadne and organised his line of battle so that Isis and his three frigates (Venus, Aurora, and Ariadne) were close to shore guarding the windward approach, and he placed his flagship, Prince of Wales, toward the leeward. Barrington, in a defensive strategy, placed his transports inside the bay but behind his battle line, which took him the entire evening of 14 December. By 1100 hours the next day, most of the transports had been safely tucked behind his line.

At 1100 hours 15 December Admiral d’Estaing approached St. Lucia with ten ships of the line, and was fired on by one of the shore batteries. D’Estaing moved to engage Barrington from the rear, and a "warm conflict" raged between the two fleets, with the British supported by two shore batteries. D’Estaing was repulsed but succeeded in reforming his line of battle. At 1600 hours d’Estaing renewed his assault by attacking Barrington's centre with twelve ships of the line. Again, heavy fire was exchanged, and the French were eventually repulsed for a second time.

Outcome
On 16 December Admiral d’Estaing appeared to be preparing for a third assault against Admiral Barrington's line, but then sailed away towards the windward. On the evening of 16 December d’Estaing anchored in Gros Islet Bay, where he landed 7,000 troops for an assault on the British lines at La Vigie. Three assaults were made but British control of the high ground enabled them to repulse the French. The French troops were re-embarked, and when d'Estaing's fleet left on 29 December, the island surrendered to the British.

Order of battle

French line of battle

British line of battle

Sources and references 
 Notes

References

 Bibliography
 
 
 

Conflicts in 1778
Naval battles of the American Revolutionary War involving France
Naval battles of the American Revolutionary War
1778 in France
Battle
1778 in the British Empire
1778 in the Caribbean